
Gmina Międzylesie is an urban-rural gmina (administrative district) in Kłodzko County, Lower Silesian Voivodeship, in south-western Poland.

Neighbouring gminas
Gmina Międzylesie is bordered by the gminas of Bystrzyca Kłodzka and Stronie Śląskie. It also borders the Czech Republic.

Villages
Apart from the town of Międzylesie, the gmina contains the villages of Boboszów, Czerwony Strumień, Długopole Górne, Dolnik, Domaszków, Gajnik, Gniewoszów, Goworów, Jaworek, Jodłów, Kamieńczyk, Lesica, Michałowice, Nagodzice, Niemojów, Nowa Wieś, Pisary, Potoczek, Różanka, Roztoki, Smreczyna and Szklarnia.

Twin towns – sister cities

Gmina Międzylesie is twinned with:
 Dolsk, Poland
 Králíky, Czech Republic
 Lohne, Germany

References

Miedzylesie
Kłodzko County